Cenotillo Municipality (Yucatec Maya: "little cenote") is one of the 106 municipalities in the Mexican state of Yucatán containing (614.43 km2) of land and is located roughly  east of the city of Mérida.

History
There is no accurate data on when the town was founded, but before the conquest, it was part of the chieftainship of Cupules. After colonization, it became part of the encomienda system and some of the first encomenderos were Diego Burgos and don Diego López de Ricalde in 1583, followed by Lorenzo Coella in 1627. Subsequent encomenderos included José Domingo Pardío in 1744.

Yucatán declared its independence from the Spanish Crown in 1821, and in 1825 the area was assigned to the Valladolid Municipality. In 1867, it was assigned to the Espita Municipality and in 1988 it was confirmed as head of its own municipality.

Governance
The municipal president is elected for a three-year term. The town council has four councilpersons, who serve as Secretary and councilors of sports, parks and gardens, and potable water.

Communities
The head of the municipality is Cenotillo, Yucatán. The populated areas of the municipality besides the seat include Cantún, Chunyucú, Cunyá, Ebtún, Kakalhá, Karin, Kaxec, Mococa, Muctal, Ocal, Pacel, Palmero, Petil, San Antonio, San Felipe, San Nicolás, San Pedro, San Ruto, Santa Clara, Sihonal, Tixbacab, Tzumbalam, Yodzonot 2 and Yohman. The significant populations are shown below:

Local festivals
Every year from 3 to 13 August a festival is held in honor of Santa Clara in Cenotillo. In Tixbacab from the 13 to 15 August there is an annual celebration for the Virgin of the Assumption.

Tourist attractions
 Church of Santa Clara, built in the seventeenth century
 Church of the Virgin of the Nativity, built in the seventeenth century
 archaeological site at Tzebtun
 Cenote A´yin  
 Cenote Catak Dzonot 
 Cenote Itzamna
 Cenote K´ai-pech
 Cenote Mul´Dzonot
 Hacienda Tixbacab

References

Municipalities of Yucatán